Eilvese is a railway station located in Eilvese, Germany. The station is located on the Bremen–Hanover railway. The train services are operated by Deutsche Bahn as part of the Hanover S-Bahn. Elivese is served by the S2. It is in the Region zone of Hannover.

Train services
The following services currently call at Elivese:

Railway stations in Lower Saxony
Hannover S-Bahn stations